Abigél may refer to:

 Abigail (name)
 Abigél (novel), a novel by Magda Szabó